Boonjumnong is a surname. Notable people with the surname include:

Manus Boonjumnong (born 1980), Thai boxer
Non Boonjumnong (born 1982), Thai boxer, brother of Manus

Thai-language surnames